A blended wing body (BWB), also known as blended body or hybrid wing body (HWB), is a fixed-wing aircraft having no clear dividing line between the wings and the main body of the craft. The aircraft has distinct wing and body structures, which are smoothly blended together with no clear dividing line. This contrasts with a flying wing, which has no distinct fuselage, and a lifting body, which has no distinct wings. A BWB design may or may not be tailless.

The main advantage of the BWB is to reduce wetted area and the accompanying form drag associated with a conventional wing-body junction. It may also be given a wide airfoil-shaped body, allowing the entire craft to generate lift and thus reducing the size and drag of the wings.

The BWB configuration is used for both aircraft and underwater gliders.

History

In the early 1920s Nicolas Woyevodsky developed a theory of the BWB and, following wind tunnel tests, the Westland Dreadnought was built. It stalled on its first flight in 1924, severely injuring the pilot, and the project was cancelled. The idea was proposed again in the early 1940s for a Miles M.26 airliner project and the Miles M.30 "X Minor" research prototype was built to investigate it. The McDonnell XP-67 prototype interceptor also flew in 1944 but did not meet expectations.

NASA returned to the concept in the 1990s with an artificially stabilized  model (6% scale) called BWB-17, built by Stanford University, which was flown in 1997 and showed good handling qualities. From 2000 NASA went on to develop a remotely controlled research model with a  wingspan.

NASA has also jointly explored BWB designs for the Boeing X-48 unmanned aerial vehicle. Studies suggested that a BWB airliner carrying from 450 to 800 passengers could achieve fuel savings of over 20 percent.

Airbus is studying a BWB design as a possible replacement for the A320neo family. A sub-scale model flew for the first time in June 2019 as part of the MAVERIC (Model Aircraft for Validation and Experimentation of Robust Innovative Controls) programme, which Airbus hopes will help it reduce CO2 emissions by up to 50% relative to 2005 levels.

The N3-X NASA concept uses a number of superconducting electric motors to drive the distributed fans to lower the fuel burn, emissions, and noise. The power to drive these electric fans is generated by two wing-tip mounted gas-turbine-driven superconducting electric generators. This idea for a possible future aircraft is called a "hybrid wing body" or sometimes a blended wing body. In this design, the wing blends seamlessly into the body of the aircraft, which makes it extremely aerodynamic and holds great promise for dramatic reductions in fuel consumption, noise and emissions. NASA develops concepts like these to test in computer simulations and as models in wind tunnels to prove whether the possible benefits would actually occur.

Characteristics

The wide interior spaces created by the blending pose novel structural challenges. NASA has been studying foam-clad stitched-fabric carbon fiber composite skinning to create uninterrupted cabin space.

The BWB form minimises the total wetted area – the surface area of the aircraft skin, thus reducing skin drag to a minimum. It also creates a thickening of the wing root area, allowing a more efficient structure and reduced weight compared to a conventional craft. NASA also plans to integrate Ultra High Bypass (UHB) ratio jet engines with the hybrid wing body.

A conventional tubular fuselage carries 12–13% of the total lift compared to 31–43% carried by the centerbody in a BWB, where an intermediate lifting-fuselage configuration better suited to narrowbody sized airliners would carry 25–32% for a 6.1–8.2% increase in fuel efficiency.

Potential advantages
Significant payload advantages in strategic airlift, air freight, and aerial refueling roles
 Increased fuel efficiency – 10.9% better than a conventional widebody, to over 20% than a comparable conventional aircraft..A 2022 US Air Force report shows a BWB “increases aerodynamic efficiency by at least 30% over current air force tanker and mobility aircraft“.
Lower noise – NASA audio simulations show a 15dB reduction of Boeing 777-class aircraft, while other studies show 22–42 dB reduction below Stage 4 level, depending on configuration.

Potential disadvantages
Evacuating a BWB in an emergency could be a challenge. Because of the aircraft's shape, the seating layout would be theatre-style instead of tubular. This imposes inherent limits on the number of exit doors.
It has been suggested that BWB interiors would be windowless, more recent information shows that windows may be positioned differently but involve the same weight penalties as a conventional aircraft.
It has been suggested that passengers at the edges of the cabin may feel uncomfortable during wing roll however, passengers in large conventional aircraft like the 777 are equally susceptible to dutch roll.
The centre wingbox needs to be tall to be used as a passenger cabin, requiring a larger wing span to balance out.
A BWB has more empty weight for a given payload, and may not be economical for short missions of around four or fewer hours.
A larger wing span may be incompatible with some airport infrastructure, requiring folding wings similar to the Boeing777X.
It is more expensive to modify the design to create differently-sized variants compared to a conventional fuselage and wing which can be stretched or shrunk easily.

List of blended wing body aircraft

|-
| Airbus Maveric|| EU || UAV  || Experimental || 2019 || Prototype || 1 || 
|-
| Boeing X-45 || USA || UAV  || Experimental || 2002 || Prototype || 2 ||
|-
| Boeing X-48 (C) || USA || UAV || Experimental || 2013 || Prototype || 2 || Two engine
|-
| Boeing X-48 (B) || USA || UAV || Experimental || 2007 || Prototype || 2 || Three engine
|-
| Lockheed A-12, M-21 and YF-12 || US || Jet || Reconnaissance || 1962 || production || 18 || YF-12 was a prototype interceptor
|-
| Lockheed SR-71 Blackbird || US || Jet || Reconnaissance || 1964 || production || 32 || 
|-
| Northrop Grumman Bat || US || Prop/electric || Reconnaissance || 2006 || production || 10 || 
|-
| McDonnell XP-67 || USA || Propeller || Fighter || 1944 || Prototype || 1 || Aerofoil profile maintained throughout.
|-
| Miles M.30 || UK || Propeller || Experimental || 1942 || Prototype || 1 || 
|-
| Rockwell B-1 Lancer || USA || Jet || Bomber || 1974 || Production || 104 || Variable-sweep wing
|-
| Tupolev Tu-160 || USSR || Jet || Bomber || 1981 || Production || 36 || Variable-sweep wing
|-
| Tupolev Tu-404 || Russia || Propeller || Airliner || 1991 || Project || 0 || One of two alternatives studied
|-
| Westland Dreadnought || UK || Propeller || Transport || 1924 || Prototype || 1 || Mail plane. Aerofoil profile maintained throughout.
|}

In popular culture

Popular Science concept art

A concept photo of a blended wing body commercial aircraft appeared in the November 2003 issue of Popular Science magazine.  Artists Neill Blomkamp and Simon van de Lagemaat from The Embassy Visual Effects created the photo for the magazine using computer graphics software to depict the future of aviation and air travel. In 2006 the image was used in an email hoax claiming that Boeing had developed a 1000-passenger jetliner (the "Boeing 797") with a "radical Blended Wing design" and Boeing refuted the claim.

See also
Aurora D8
Flying-V jet
List of flying wings
Lifting body
Silent Aircraft Initiative, a BWB study

References

Further reading
 
 
 
 
 
 
 
 

 
Aircraft configurations
Aircraft wing design
Lists of aircraft by wing configuration